Manuela Dalla Valle (born 20 January 1963 in Como) is a retired medley and breaststroke swimmer from Italy, who represented her native country in four consecutive Summer Olympics, starting in 1984. She won her first international senior medal, a silver in the women's 100 m breaststroke, at the 1987 European Championships (long course).

References

External links
 

1963 births
Living people
Italian female breaststroke swimmers
Italian female freestyle swimmers
Italian female medley swimmers
Swimmers at the 1984 Summer Olympics
Swimmers at the 1988 Summer Olympics
Swimmers at the 1992 Summer Olympics
Swimmers at the 1996 Summer Olympics
Olympic swimmers of Italy
Sportspeople from Como
European Aquatics Championships medalists in swimming
Mediterranean Games gold medalists for Italy
Swimmers at the 1987 Mediterranean Games
Swimmers at the 1991 Mediterranean Games
Swimmers at the 1993 Mediterranean Games
Universiade medalists in swimming
Mediterranean Games medalists in swimming
Universiade gold medalists for Italy
Universiade silver medalists for Italy
Universiade bronze medalists for Italy
Medalists at the 1983 Summer Universiade
Medalists at the 1985 Summer Universiade
Medalists at the 1987 Summer Universiade
Swimmers at the 1979 Mediterranean Games
20th-century Italian women